Bader Ahmed Saleh  is a football player from the United Arab Emirates who played as a midfielder for United Arab Emirates in the 1984 Asian Cup.

External links
Stats

References

Living people
Emirati footballers
United Arab Emirates international footballers
1980 AFC Asian Cup players
1984 AFC Asian Cup players
UAE Pro League players
Association football midfielders
Year of birth missing (living people)